Lucien Le Guével (20 December 1914 – 7 December 1989) was a French racing cyclist. He rode in the 1938 Tour de France.

References

1914 births
1989 deaths
French male cyclists
Place of birth missing